Surman is a surname. Notable people with the surname include:

Andrew Surman (born 1986), South African-born English footballer
Finn Surman (born 2003), New Zealand professional footballer
Frank Surman, (1865/1866–1925), New Zealand rugby union footballer
Godfrey Surman (1914–1987), English cricketer
John Surman (born 1944), English jazz musician and composer
John Surman Carden (1771–1858), officer of the British Royal Navy in the early nineteenth century
Kate Surman (born 1991), Australian rules footballer playing
Les Surman, English professional footballer
Mark Surman (born 1969), executive director of the Mozilla Foundation
Rebecca Surman, American physicist
Roman Surman (active since 2006), American guitarist
Thomas Surman, professional rugby league footballer who played in the 1900s
Tonya Surman, Canadian social entrepreneur, CEO of the Centre for Social Innovation

Other uses 
Surman, Libya, coastal city in Western Libya

See also
Surma (disambiguation)
Surmann